Cruciata pedemontana, the Piedmont bedstraw, is a species of plant in the Rubiaceae. It is native to the southern and central Europe, the Black Sea Basin, and southwestern and Central Asia from Turkey to Iran to Kazakhstan. It is also naturalized in parts of the United States (south-central and eastern parts from Texas to New York, plus the northwest from Washington and Oregon to Montana).

Leaves are broadly ovate, usually four per node.

Varieties
Two varieties are recognized (as of May 2014):
Cruciata pedemontana var. pedemontana
Cruciata pedemontana var. procumbens (Asch.) Soó - France and Italy (including Corsica and Sardinia)

References

External links
US Department of Agriculture plants profile, 
US Department of Agriculture, National Forest Service, weed of the week , 
Vanderbilt University, Piedmont bedstraw
Flore Alpes, Croisette du Piémont
Flora Acta Plantarum, 
Botany Czech, svízelka piemontská / krížavka piemontská
Flora-On, Portugal, 
Botanik im Bild  /  Flora von Österreich, Liechtenstein und Südtirol, Piemont-Kreuzlabkraut  /  Piemonteser Kreuzlabkraut
Discover Life, 
Southeastern Flora, 
Eastern Washington University, Flora of Eastern Washington and Adjacent Idaho , 
Botanische Spaziergaenge, Bilder von Österreichs Flora, Cruciata pedemontana / Piemont- Kreuzlabkraut
Eastern Forests Threat Center, Piedmont bedstraw 

Rubieae
Flora of Europe
Flora of Central Asia
Flora of Turkey
Flora of Iran
Flora of Italy
Flora of Greece
Flora of Ukraine
Flora of Romania
Flora of Sardinia
Flora of Corsica
Flora of Bulgaria
Flora of Austria
Flora of Switzerland
Flora of Russia
Flora of Spain
Flora of Portugal
Flora of Kazakhstan